Grégoire Ahongbonon (born 1953) founded the St Camille Association in 1994 to provide residential care for people in West Africa suffering from mental illness.

Biography
Ahongbonon was born in Benin and immigrated to Côte d'Ivoire.

Ahongbonon was formerly a mechanic.

He was inspired to start the association following experiencing depression himself, which led him to consider suicide. He is quoted as saying "As long as there is one man in chains, it is humanity who is chained."

Ahongbonon won the Daily Trust African of the Year 2015, which included a $50,000 prize.

In 2020 he won the Dr. Guislain Award, attributed by the Guislain Institute (Brothers of Charity) and Johnson & Johnson - dr. Janssen.

Literature
 Adjovi, Laeila,  Gregoire Ahongbonon: Freeing people chained for being ill, (BBC, 17 February 2016),
 Nigeria: I've Treated 60,000 Mentally-Ill - Ahongbonon - allAfrica.com, in: allafrica.com, 2016.
 Grégoire Ahongbonon wins the 2020 Dr. Guislain Award 2020, in: Deus Caritas Est, december 2020.

References

1953 births
Living people
Beninese emigrants to Ivory Coast
Place of birth missing (living people)
Date of birth missing (living people)